Mogens Ellegaard (4 March 1935 – 28 March 1995) was an accordion player from Denmark. He is regarded as the "father of the classical accordion."

Early life 

Ellegaard was the son of a cabinet maker and began studying the instrument at the age of eight.

Free-bass accordion 

In 1952 Ellegaard competed at the Confédération internationale des accordéonistes Coupe Mondiale (World Cup) in the Netherlands. At this time he heard a free-bass accordion and decided he must get such an instrument. In the meantime, he studied literature at Schneekloth's College in Copenhagen and graduated with honors. After military service he was given an American Embassy Literary Award for study in the United States and supported himself in part by playing this accordion in restaurants and at popular concerts.

Ellegaard returned to Denmark in 1958 and the Danish pianist/composer Vilfred Kjaer (1906-1969) wrote a concerto for him, which led to the creation of a very popular concerto for accordion by the composer Ole Schmidt.

Ellegaard continued,

Symphonic Fantasy and Allegro was premiered by the Danish Radio Symphony with the composer conducting. Ole Schmidt made the following comment about the work, "I hated accordion until I met Mogens Ellegaard. He made me decide to write an accordion concerto for him."
Some of the works Mogens Ellegaard commissioned and premiered are:

 Hans Abrahamsen
 Canzone (1977-8) for accordion solo
 Niels Viggo Bentzon 
 Concert voor accordeon (1962/63)
 In the Zoo op. 164 (1964) 
 Sinfonia concertante (1965) for two accordions, string orchestra and percussion
 Antonio Bibalo 
 Sonata, quasi una fantasia (1977)
 Vagn Holmboe 
 Sonata, op. 143A (1979)
 Vilfred Kjær
 Jubilesse infameuse, concerto (1957) 
 Leif Kayser
 Arabesques(1975)
 Suite Sacra (1984)
 Confetti (1992) 
Torbjörn Lundquist
 Partita piccola (1963)
 Metamorphoses (1965)
 Nine two-part inventions (1966)
 Plasticity - Plastiska varianter - Plastische Varianten... (1967)
 Sonatina piccola (1967/1983)
 Ballad, for 2 accordion (1968)
 Botany play (1968)
 Microscope, 21 pieces (1971)
 Copenhagen music, for accordion solo and accordion quintet (1972)
 Lappri (1972)
 Assoziationen (1981)
 Arne Nordheim
 Signals, for accordion, electric guitar and percussion (1967)
 Dinosauros, for accordion and tape (1970)
 Spur, for accordion and orchestra (1975)
 Flashing (1985)
 Per Nørgård 
 Introduction and toccata(1964) (originally written for Lars Bjarne)
 Anatomic Safari for accordion solo (1967)
 Recall (1968) for accordion and orchestra
 Arcana for accordion, electric guitar and percussion (1970)
 Steen Pade 
 Udflugt med umveje (Excursions With Detours) (1984)
 Aprilis (1987) 
 Cadenza (1987)
 Karl Aage Rasmussen
 Invention (1972)
 Ole Schmidt
 Symphonic Fantasy and Allegro, op. 20 for accordion and orchestra (1958)
 Toccata 1 op. 24 (1960)
 Toccata 2 op. 28 (1964)
 Escape of the meatball over the fence (1967)

Ellegaard has performed this contemporary music in solo recitals and chamber music concerts in Moscow, New York City, Tel Aviv, Amsterdam, Rome, Paris, Dublin, Reykjavík, Zagreb and Toronto, to name a few. He has been a soloist with London's Royal Philharmonic, the Detroit Symphony, the Toronto Symphony, Sudwestfunk Symphonie Orchester, Stockholm, Oslo and Helsinki Philharmonic orchestras, BBC Scottish Symphony, and all of the Danish orchestras. He has appeared at international festivals such as Warsaw Autumn, I.S.C.M., and Bergen. He was for many years a member of the  Trio Mobile with percussionist Bent Lylloff and guitarist Ingolf Olsen, commissioning pieces from Thorbjörn Lundquist, Ib Nørholm, Arne Nordheim, Per Nørgård, Finn Mortensen and others.  As a chamber musician he was later concertizing extensively with a trio consisting of his Hungarian born pianist, and accordionist wife, Marta Bene and percussionist Gert Sørensen.

Accordion professor 

In the early-1960s Ellegaard began working with Lars Holm at the Malmö Sweden Accordion Studio where he taught free-bass accordion. He wrote "Comprehensive Method for the Chromatic Free Bass System" which was published by Hohner in New York City in 1964. In 1970 he founded the accordion department at The Royal Danish Academy of Music in Copenhagen. In 1977 he became a full professor.

In 1989 he was appointed head of the accordion faculty of the Hochschule fur Musik und Darstellende Kunst in Graz, Austria. He has conducted master class courses and seminars at Warsaw's Chopin Academy, Helsinki's Sibelius Academy, Trossingen Bundesakademie (Germany), and Conservatories in the Netherlands, Spain, etc. Today his students teach at Scandinavian music academies, as well as at the Royal Academy in London, many Conservatories in Germany, the Netherlands, and other locations.

CDs
 Contemporary Danish Accordion Music, Point, PCD 5073  (1987) met Danish Radio Symphony Orchestra o.l.v. Ole Schmidt
 Jeux à trois, G.E.M. 2001 (1994), Music for classical accordion and percussion, met Márta Bene, accordeon en Gert Sørensen, slagwerk.
 Mogens Ellegaard discography at Discogs

References

1935 births
1995 deaths
Classical accordionists
Avant-garde accordionists
Danish musicians
20th-century classical musicians
20th-century Danish musicians
20th-century accordionists